Orthocycloceras is an extinct genus of actively mobile carnivorous cephalopods, essentially a Nautiloid, that lived in what would be Europe during the Silurian to Devonian from 428.2—412.3 mya, existing for approximately .

Taxonomy
Orthocycloceras was assigned to Orthocerida Sepkoski (2002).

Morphology
The shell is usually long, and may be straight ("orthoconic") or gently curved.  In life, these animals may have been similar to the modern squid, except for the long shell.

Fossil distribution
Fossil distribution is exclusive to Sardinia and Austria.

References

Prehistoric nautiloid genera
Silurian animals
Wenlock first appearances
Prehistoric animals of Europe
Devonian extinctions